The Society for the History of Authorship, Reading and Publishing (SHARP) formed in 1991 in the United States on the initiative of scholars Jonathan Rose, Simon Eliot, and others. Its members study the history of books and the "composition, mediation, reception, survival, and transformation of written communication." The group maintains an electronic discussion list (SHARP-L), produces the academic journal Book History (est. 1998), and holds annual meetings. Membership consists mostly of British and American scholars.

See also
 Similar organizations:
 American Library Association's Rare Books and Manuscripts Section
 Bibliographical Society, UK
 Bibliographical Society of America
 Printing Historical Society, UK
 American Printing History Association

References

External links
 Official site
 SHARP-L archive, 1992-

History of books
Organizations established in 1991
History organizations based in the United States
Professional associations based in the United States